Christian Djidagui Nassif (born 1 January 1994 in Bangui, Central African Republic) is a Central African swimmer specializing in freestyle. He competed in the 50 m event at the 2012 Summer Olympics and finished with a rank of 55. He also competed in the 50 meter event at the 2013 World Aquatics Championships.

References

External links

1994 births
Living people
People from Bangui
Central African Republic male freestyle swimmers
Swimmers at the 2012 Summer Olympics
Swimmers at the 2016 Summer Olympics
Olympic swimmers of the Central African Republic